Khun Win Thaung (born 17 October 1956) is a Burmese politician and former political prisoner who currently serves as an Amyotha Hluttaw MP for Kachin State No. 11 constituency. He is a member of the National League for Democracy.

Early life and education
He was born on 17 October 1956 in Aung Myay Thar village, Bago, Myanmar. He an ethnic Pa-O. He graduated with B.V.S (Rgn) from Yangon. He is also a veterinarian.

Political career
Khun was arrested and sentenced to 5 years with hard labor under Section 5 for participation in the 8888 uprising. He is a member of the National League for Democracy. In the 2015 Myanmar general election, he was elected as an Amyotha Hluttaw MP, winning a majority of 9985 votes and elected representative from Kachin  State No. 11 parliamentary constituency.

References

National League for Democracy politicians
1956 births
Living people
People from Kachin State